San Juan Bautista Suchitepec is a town and municipality in Oaxaca in south-western Mexico. The municipality covers an area of 38.28 km². 
It is part of the Huajuapan District in the north of the Mixteca Region.

As of 2005, the municipality had a total population of 412.

References

Municipalities of Oaxaca